"Lost" is a song by American hip hop recording artist Gorilla Zoe, released October 14, 2008 as the lead single from his second studio album Don't Feed Da Animals (2009). The song leaked in May 2008 entitled "Losin' My Mind", featuring a verse from fellow American rapper Lil Wayne. It is notable that, specifically with the Lil Wayne version, both songs use the auto-tune effect. "Lost" received positive reviews from critics praising Drumma Boy's electronic production and Zoe's sincere Auto-Tune delivery of introspective lyrics.

Critical reception
"Lost" received positive reviews from music critics praising the production and usage of Auto-Tune to reveal an honest performance by Zoe. Steve 'Flash' Juon of RapReviews praised the synth production and use of Auto-Tune to give Zoe a heartfelt performance, saying that "You might not think someone with Zoe's deep raspy flow could pull off crooning, but Drumma Boy plays to his strengths and gives him a joint he can sing low and slow over." Nathan Slavik of DJBooth was surprised by the honesty and self-awareness delivered by Zoe about his newfound lifestyle, saying that "'Lost' is a display of the lyricist lurking behind Zoe’s gravel-voiced swagger, dropping carefully constructed lines like “I’m losing my mind, I’m losing control...of the wheel swerving on and off the road.” That’s right, Zoe dropped a dope metaphor. Suck on that haters." Brendan Frederick of XXL called it "a brink-of-insanity cry for help that’s filled with booming 808s and sing-along digital harmonies." AllMusic's David Jeffries felt that the introspective lyricism were being overshadowed by sophomoric humor, calling it "a heartfelt song about loneliness that would work splendidly if it wasn't for the diaper talk."

Chart performance
"Lost" debuted at number 93 on the Billboard Hot 100 for the week of January 24, 2009. Six weeks later, it moved twenty-two spots to peak at number 71 the week of March 7, staying on the chart for eleven weeks.

Music video
The music video was directed by Zollo and premiered on the BET show The Deal. Miami-based rapper Rick Ross makes a cameo appearance along with Atlanta-based rappers Young Jeezy, Ludacris, Plies, Shawty Lo, Lil Jon, Waka Flocka Flame, Gucci Mane, other cameo appearances did include Erup, KRS-One, Slick Rick, Nelly, Fat Joe, YoungBloodz, Cutty, Andre 3000, Big Boi, Fiend, N.O.R.E., DMX, Chi McBride AND Raekwon. The music video is similar to the music video of "Somebody's Watching Me" by R&B artist Rockwell, relating the subject's paranoid fears of being followed and watched, although the lyrics of "Lost" chronicle the emptiness and loneliness that fame can bring. The music video does not show the underground background singer named as "the mistress". It was released on BET, MTV, MTV2 and MTV Jams on December 23, 2008 and on iTunes on January 19, 2009.

Remixes and freestyle
On September 14, 2008, American rapper Bow Wow released a freestyle to the song.

Charts

Weekly charts

Year-end charts

References

2008 singles
2008 songs
Gorilla Zoe songs
Bad Boy Records singles
Songs written by Gorilla Zoe
Songs written by Drumma Boy